The Yamaha YZR 250 was a 250cc Grand Prix racing motorcycle made by Yamaha from 1973 through 2003.

Notes

External links

Yamaha motorcycles
Grand Prix motorcycles
Motorcycles introduced in 1990
Two-stroke motorcycles